Alessandro Longhi (born 25 June 1989) is an Italian footballer who plays as a left back for Serie D club S.S.D. Audace Cerignola.

Club career
Born in Desenzano del Garda, the Province of Brescia, Longhi started his career at Serie D (non-professional/regional league) team Salò. In mid-2009 Salò merged with Feralpi Lonato and admitted to Lega Pro Seconda Divisione to replace the vacancy left by Pistoiese. That season he played 31 times in the professional league and played twice in promotion playoffs, finished as the losing semi-finalists.

In August 2010 he was signed by Serie B team Triestina. After the team relegated, he was sold to Serie A team Chievo. However, he was immediately farmed to Serie B Sassuolo in co-ownership deal, for €150,000 in a 3-year contract.

In June 2014 Sassuolo purchased Longhi outright for an additional €1.65 million.

On 1 July 2016 Longhi became a free agent. In the same transfer window he was signed by Serie B club Pisa in a 2-year contract.

On 15 January 2019, Longhi joined Padova until 30 June 2019 with an option for 2019–20 season.

International career
He received call-up from Italy U-21 Serie B team against Serbian First League Selection in March 2011. He replaced Gianluigi Bianco at half time. He also played for Italy U-20 Lega Pro team against Slovenia U-20 team in 2010, the ultimate match of 2008–09 Mirop Cup.

References

External links
 Football.it profile 
 
 
 
 

1989 births
People from Desenzano del Garda
Footballers from Lombardy
Living people
Italian footballers
Association football fullbacks
FeralpiSalò players
U.S. Triestina Calcio 1918 players
U.S. Sassuolo Calcio players
Pisa S.C. players
Brescia Calcio players
Calcio Padova players
S.S.D. Audace Cerignola players
Serie A players
Serie B players
Serie C players
Serie D players
Sportspeople from the Province of Brescia